Ypato (Greek: Ύπατο) is a small village in Thebes Municipality, Boeotia, Greece. It is located east of Thebes, in the slopes of Mount Ypatio. According to the 2011 Census, it has 438 residents.

Etymology 
The village was known as Syrtzi (Σύρτζι) until 1930. In the same year it was renamed to Ypato.

See also 

 List of settlements in Boeotia

References 

Populated places in Boeotia